Guangdong Experimental High School is a Public High School in Guangzhou, Guangdong Province, People's Republic of China.

The school is commonly known as SS, an abbreviation of Sheng Shi or Sang Sat,() by parents and students in Guangzhou. It means 'Provincial Experimental (school)', which abbreviates Guangdong Experimental High School.

If unspecified, Guangdong Experimental High School refers to the senior high campus in Fangcun.

History
The history of the school has always been a controversial topic as it involves many schools in the city after a series of mergers and splits. Strictly speaking, the current school established in 1960, however, the origin of the school can be traced back to 'Guǎngdōng Gézhì Xuétáng'() in 1888. Because many reforms were made as the school developed, there are different stories regarding this topic. Some argue that the establishing date of the school should be in 1924. It is backed up by the story that the school selected the year to commemorate Sun Yat-sen.

In 1888, Dr. Andrew Patton Happer established the Christian College in Shaji, Guangzhou, known as '广东格致学堂' in Chinese. It was then reformed into National Higher Normal College,  known as '两广优级师范学堂' in Chinese, in 1910 to train teachers within Guangdong and Guangxi Provinces.

In 1924, the college merged into National Kwangtung University, which later became the Sun Yat-sen University in 1926, as its affiliated high school and primary school.

Due to the disciplinary adjustment to Chinese Higher Education, four high schools merged into the Affiliated School of South China Normal University in 1952:

 the Affiliated School of Sun Yat-Sen University
 the Affiliated High School of Lingnan University
 the Affiliated High School of South China Associated University
 the Affiliated High School of Guangdong College of Arts & Science.

In 1960, the school was split into a high school and a primary school. The high school later became the current Affiliated High School of South China Normal University, whereas the primary school had then reformed into the current school.

Guangdong Experimental High School was renamed to the No.60 Middle School of Guangzhou for a decade during Cultural Revolution. After that, it formalised its name as Guangdong Experimental High School in 1987.

In 2008, The current senior management team of the school decided to use 1888 as the official establishing date of the school and celebrated the school's 120th anniversary. This flawed decision, is now widely accepted by the public.

Present day
The school now has four campuses. The main campus, senior high campus, locates at Kengkou, Liwan District, Guangzhou. It is also known as the 'New Campus' or 'Fangcun Campus' to students as it was constructed in 2004 and the location was in the previous Fangcun District, which was withdrawn and merged to Liwan District in 2005.

The old campus, also known as 'Zhongsi Campus', then became the junior high campus, since three upper grades moved to the new campus. It is located at No.4 Zhongshan Rd in Yuexiu District, Guangzhou. 'Zhongsi Campus'  was the only campus before the school expanded at the beginning of the 21st century. It represents the history and development of the school since 1960.

Other campuses are as follows;

 Tianhe Campus, locates at Yuangang, Tianhe District, Guangzhou.
 Shunde Campus was established in 2008 in Shunde, Foshan.
 Nanhai Campus was established on 19 April 2009 in Nanhai, Foshan.

Generally, these three campuses are not accepted as part of the school. Although they are administered by the same senior management team and have links with SS's main campus, they are highly independent and completely privately funded. They are more commonly known as the affiliated Schools of SS, and are generally excluded by students and parents when regarding to school.

Senior High

Admissions
Guangdong Experimental High School selects students by their academic abilities, primarily by students' results in 'Zhongkao' (the Senior High School Entrance Examination). Guangdong Experimental School has always maintained a fairly high entrance requirement to ensure the limited places are offered to students who meet the academic standard.

Similar to most of the other high schools that have experienced an expansion in the 21st century, the school now has the capability to offer additional places to students who missed the set requirements. However, a relatively lower score is still required and an additional tuition fee will be charged.

The school also encourages students to have talents besides academics, primarily in sports and performing arts, to apply. A different application process is offered, where good academic results are not required. This policy has attracted many student athletes, singers and dancers, and it proves to be a successful measure in boosting the school's competitiveness outside academic areas.

Campus
Senior high campus is a boarding campus accommodating about 3000 students. The first group of students moved in from the old campus in 2004, when the construction was completed. (Although there were still minor ongoing constructions taking place at the time and some facilities were yet to be installed.) Later in 2005, the whole senior high department, including the senior management team, had moved over to the new campus. Student number has increased rapidly since the expansion in 2004. The new campus allows the school to offer more than 1000 places each year to new junior graduates. All the facilities were put in 2005.

The campus consists of teaching buildings, the dormitories, a playground and a restaurant. The three gradesare taught in three separate buildings with 20 classrooms in each. There is a laboratory building behind the three main teaching buildings equipped with facilities for Physics, Chemistry, Biology and Technology experiments.
The library, study rooms, computer rooms and a large lecture room are located in the centre building of the area, with a small outdoor stage at the back. The administration building, with meeting rooms for conferences and offices of the principals, is located in the front between the two teaching buildings. All buildings are internally connected, and the architecture is modern.

The students are arranged to live in the two dormitories by gender, and six students share a room. Each of the building have 6 floors and 35 rooms to accommodate about 95% of the students. All rooms are en suite and equipped with air conditioning, lockers and cupboards. There is also a staff dormitory next to the student ones.

The school provides sporting facilities. There is a gym primarily for badminton, table tennis and eight outdoor basketball courts and a standard 400m track with a football pitch in the middle. There is also a standard 50m swimming pool and a gym  next to it. The sports centre is sometimes used as a stage for performances, ceremonies and formal presentations.

Academics
Guangdong Experimental High School is known for the student's academic performances, especially their performance in Gaokao (the National Higher Education Entrance Examination).

Over the last decade, 36 students nailed the first place in the province, in both overall score and single subjects. In 2009, Guangdong Experimental High School graduates took up 21 places in the top 200 in the province, including 7 first places in different subjects. 40% of the top scorers (above 680*) in the city are from Experimental High School, 20% for score over 650 and 10% for over 600.

Extracurricular activities
The school offers a vast range of extracurricular activities to the students.

Choir
Guangdong Experimental High School Choir, founded in 1952, has participated in many national and international chorus competitions and won. It is believed to be one of the best vocal groups in China. Being a choir that was made up of no professionals but only high school students, it has won nine consecutive champions in the Interscholastic Chorus Competitions. Recent awards were received from festivals held in Australia, Austria, Japan, Korea and Germany. In 2004 the choir won the top prize in vocal and choir competitions in the first National Interscholastic Arts Show and was selected as the best programme in the Awards Evening in the People's Congress Hall.

Sports
Badminton is the most traditional and the strongest sport of the school.

The popularity of basketball has had a dramatic growth in high schools in recent years, with students' participation rapidly increasing. The new campus offers facilities, including eight outdoor full courts and an indoor court for the students and staff. Court 1 - 2, 3 - 4, 5 - 6 are shared between senior 1 - 3. Court 7 is the training court for the school team. Court 8 is for the staff.

The school runs a basketball team, which plays in the Nike High School League as well as local competitions. The school team squad train up to 4 days a week during term-time. Tryouts are normally held in the second semester every year for Senior 1 students for the coming season. However, extraordinary players may be recruited anytime in the year.

Notable alumni
SS has thousands of notable alumni all over the world, including four fellows of the Chinese Academy of Sciences, three fellows of the Chinese Academy of Engineering.

Deng Ximing – (CAS)
Huang Yaoxiang – (CAE)
Fan Haifu – (CAS)
Cai Ruixian – (CAS)
Jiang Boju – (CAS)
Cen Kefa – (CAE)
Zhong Nanshan – (CAE)

American Campus Fraud

In September 2011, several major medias reported that a new campus of SS in Los Angeles, CA, United States was established, which made SS the first Chinese high school to have a campus in the United States of America. However, this was soon discovered to be a fraud, and the said collaboration between SS and the US Academy was never formed in any ways. A few weeks later, the school made a formal apology to the public, the alumni in America in particular.

References

External links

 Guangdong Experimental High School official website

Educational institutions established in 1888
High schools in Guangdong
Senior secondary schools in China
1888 establishments in China